Asplenium parvulum is a species name of a fern, which may refer to:

Asplenium parvulum Hook., described in 1840, now considered a synonym of Asplenium trilobum
Asplenium parvulum M.Martens & Galeotti, described in 1842, an invalid later homonym of the above, now called Asplenium resiliens

parvulum